Eftim Gerzilov (born 2 December 1952) is a Bulgarian rower. He competed in the men's quadruple sculls event at the 1976 Summer Olympics.

References

1952 births
Living people
Bulgarian male rowers
Olympic rowers of Bulgaria
Rowers at the 1976 Summer Olympics
Place of birth missing (living people)